McNeal is a surname. Notable people with the surname include:

People 
 Bobby McNeal (1891–1956), English association football player
 Brianna Rollins-McNeal (born 1991), American track and field athlete
 Bryant McNeal (born 1979), American gridiron football player
 Clyde McNeal (1928–1996), American baseball player
 Curtis McNeal (born 1989), American gridiron football player
 Don McNeal (born 1958), American gridiron football player
 Harry McNeal (1878–1945), American baseball player
 Jerel McNeal (born 1987), American basketball player
 Lutricia McNeal (born 1973), American singer
 Red McNeal (1903–?), American baseball player
 Reggie McNeal (born 1983), Canadian gridiron football player
 Robert H. McNeal (1930–1988), American historian
 Roun McNeal (born 1984), American politician
 Roy McNeal (1891–1976), American gridiron football coach
 Tom McNeal (born 1947), American novelist and short story writer
 Travis McNeal (born 1967), American gridiron football player
 Vanessa McNeal (born 1993), American social activist and documentary filmmaker

As middle name
 James McNeal Kelly (born 1964), American astronaut
 Henry McNeal Turner (1834–1915), American Methodist bishop and politician

Fictional characters 
 President McNeal, character in the Futurama episode "When Aliens Attack"
 Dr. Alice McNeal, character in the video game Ground Control II: Operation Exodus
 Bill McNeal, character in the sitcom NewsRadio

See also 
 Clan MacNeil
 McNeil (surname)
 McNeill (disambiguation)
 MacNeil
 MacNeill
 MacNeal
 MacNeille